Hainewalde is a village in Germany on the river Mandau, in the Bundesland (federal state) of Saxony and the district Görlitz, historically belonging to Upper Lusatia. The village is part of the administrative partnership Großschönau-Waltersdorf.

Geography and transportation
The community Hainewalde is approximatively 10 km apart from Zittau in the foreland of the Lusatian Mountains. The federal highway 96 passes Hainewalde in the north, the Czech border is approximatively 15 km west of it. The railroad Zittau-Varnsdorf has a station in Hainewalde.

History 
Hainewalde was first documentary mentioned in 1272. It is believed that the name is derived from the founder one founder called "Hener", "Heno", "Hening" or "Heinrich".
Settlers of the German feudal east-expansion established Hainewalde as a so-called "Waldhufendorf", by stubbing the forest along the river Mandau.

In 1392 the today's old castle, in these times gate lodge, was built as manor.

By the treaty of Prague (1636) Upper Lusatia, and therefore Hainewalde, came under the power of Saxony, which resulted constraints on independence and the freedom of religion.
This brought some Bohemian exule around 1650, which increased the local population.

From 1749 to 1753, a new castle was built by the Prussian chamberlain von Canitz.

Till 1927 Hainewalde was the residence of the old Saxon noble family Kanitz-Kyaw. As a result of the excessive debts of the nobleman, the castle, its ground and forest were sold on 12 March 1927.

Since 1928, the castle was under the authority of the neighbouring community of Großschönau. On 26 March 1933, it was occupied by the Nazi-German stormtroopers from Dresden, which set up a provisional concentration camp for political prisoners. The first prisoners arrived on 28 March 1933. On 10 August 1933, the KZ Hainewalde was closed and served as "Wehrertüchtigungslager" until the end of World War II. Until 1972, it was primarily used as residential house and remained empty since that. A private association founded in 2000 is now working on its preservation.

Main sights 
Umgebindehaeuser (typical Lusatian half-timbered houses)
Church, built in 1705-1711
The Wasserschloss, built under rule of the family von Nositz, was located north of the terraces of the new castle. The only remain of the old water castle, which was demolished in 1780, is the gate lodge with his west-side Renaissance-portal.
Schloss (New Castle), constructed in 1750–1753, along with its Baroque gardens, under the rule of the Kanitz-Kyaw family. It was renovated in 1883, the Baroque elements on the outside façade removed and replaced by "Italian"-style sgraffito.
The Baroque crypt of the family Kanitz-Kyaw, in the cemetery (1715).
Mountain Breiteberg with look-out, restaurant and "Querxhöhle"

People 
 Gottlob Friedrich Seligmann, Lutheran theologian
 Karl August Wünsche, German Christian Hebraist, born 1839

References

External links 
 
Castle Hainewalde
Crypt Kanitz-Kyaw in Hainewalde 

Populated places in Görlitz (district)